Justin Gideon Njinmah (born 15 November 2000) is a German professional footballer who plays as a forward for 3. Liga team Borussia Dortmund II, on loan from Bundesliga club Werder Bremen.

Career
Njinmah is a former youth academy player of Eimsbütteler TV and Holstein Kiel. On 6 January 2022, he signed his professional contract with SV Werder Bremen and was immediately loaned out to Borussia Dortmund II. He made his professional debut on 17 January 2022 in a 3–1 win against SV Waldhof Mannheim.

Personal life
Born in Germany, Njinmah is of Nigerian descent.

References

External links
 

2000 births
Living people
German sportspeople of Nigerian descent
Association football forwards
German footballers
3. Liga players
Regionalliga players
Holstein Kiel II players
SV Werder Bremen II players
Borussia Dortmund II players
Footballers from Hamburg